Dario Lari (born 22 October 1979 in Livorno) is a rower from Italy.  He competed for his native country at the 2004 Summer Olympics in Athens.

External links 
 
 
 

1979 births
Living people
Italian male rowers
Olympic rowers of Italy
Rowers at the 2004 Summer Olympics
Sportspeople from Livorno
World Rowing Championships medalists for Italy
Mediterranean Games gold medalists for Italy
Competitors at the 2005 Mediterranean Games
Mediterranean Games medalists in rowing